Robert James Connor (born 4 August 1960) is a Scottish former footballer, who played as a midfielder. During his playing career, Connor made nearly 600 appearances in the Scottish Football League, and earned four caps for the Scottish national side between 1986 and 1990. Connor has also been a football manager, managing Ayr United between 2005 and 2007.

Career

Club career
Born in Kilmarnock, Connor began his professional career with Ayr United in 1977. Connor also played in the Scottish Football League with Dundee, Aberdeen, Kilmarnock, Partick Thistle and finally Queen of the South in the era of Jamie McAllister and Tommy Bryce.

International career
Connor made his international debut on 29 April 1986, and made a total of four international appearances.

Coaching career
Connor has also been a football manager, managing Ayr United between 2005 and 2007.

Career statistics

Club

International

Managerial record

References

External links
 

1960 births
Living people
Scottish footballers
Scotland international footballers
Ayr United F.C. players
Dundee F.C. players
Aberdeen F.C. players
Kilmarnock F.C. players
Partick Thistle F.C. players
Queen of the South F.C. players
Scottish Football League players
Scottish football managers
Ayr United F.C. managers
Footballers from Kilmarnock
Scottish Football League representative players
Scotland under-21 international footballers
Scotland B international footballers
Association football midfielders